Mike Riggs (born April 23, 1971) is an American heavy metal guitarist. The highlights of his career include his work for Rob Zombie's solo albums (Hellbilly Deluxe, The Sinister Urge, American Made Music To Strip By, Hellbilly Super Deluxe, Past, Present & Future) and currently his skills as a guitarist, vocalist, and producer for Scum of the Earth.

Career history 
Riggs' career as a musician started at the age of 19 in 1990 when he started the band Demiltry in Austin, Texas, for whom he played the rhythm guitar and sang lead vocals. The band released only one record, a 4-track demo titled Artist of Misery for which Riggs composed the title song on the album. The band split up soon after the release. He went on after this to play for another Austin band called Skrew which included future Nine Inch Nails guitarist Danny Lohner.  He toured with Skrew supporting their first album, Burning in Water, Drowning in Flames, then went on to contribute to the recording of their second release, Dusted.  After playing with Skrew for several years, Riggs joined Prong after the release of their studio album Rude Awakening and toured with them for some time.
When Riggs was attending a WWF event, he met Rob Zombie (ex-White Zombie) who said he was working on a new album, and had yet to find a guitarist. He played guitar for Zombie on Hellbilly Deluxe and The Sinister Urge before he left the band to begin his own project. He founded the band Scum of the Earth for which he plays guitar and sings lead vocals. After signing to Eclipse Records, the band released their first album entitled Blah...Blah...Blah...Love Songs for the New Millennium on October 26, 2004, produced by famed producer Ben Burkhardt at Belt of Orion Recording in Los Angeles, California. Songs were featured in National Lampoon's TV: The Movie, on numerous MTV shows, and a slew of action sports DVDs. Riggs is best known for playing his own signature model Fernandes Vertigo with a kill switch and others with a sustainer. He also uses a wah pedal. He's used Marshall G100R CD, Diezel VH4 and Mesa Triple Rectifiers.

He is also known for playing his see-through Fernandes Vertigo guitar that is filled with fake blood that he pours on himself, drinks or spits into the crowd while playing.

In 2022 Riggs rejoined Rob Zombie's solo band when prior guitarist John 5 left to join Mötley Crüe.

Discography

with Rob Zombie 
1998: Hellbilly Deluxe
1999: American Made Music to Strip By
2001: The Sinister Urge
2003: Past, Present & Future

with Scum of the Earth 
2004: Blah...Blah...Blah...Love Songs for the New Millennium
2007: Sleaze Freak
2012: The Devil Made Me Do It

External links 
https://www.scumoftheearth.com
https://www.facebook.com/scumoftheearth

Living people
American heavy metal guitarists
1971 births
People from Ozark, Arkansas
White Zombie (band) members
Skrew members
Scum of the Earth (band) members
Alternative metal guitarists
Prong (band) members